Renwick House may refer to:
Renwick House (Davenport, Iowa), a NRHP-listed house in Davenport, Iowa
Helen Goodwin Renwick House, a NRHP-listed house at Pomona College in Claremont, California